Mickaël François (born 12 March 1988 in Montfermeil) is a French athlete specialising in the 400 metres hurdles. He represented his country at the 2013 World Championships reaching the semifinals.

His personal best in the event is 49.35 seconds set in Ninove in 2013.

International competitions

Personal bests
Outdoor
400 metres – 47.17 (Albi 2013)
400 metres hurdles – 49.35 (Ninove 2013)

Indoor
400 metres – 47.55 (Eaubonne 2008)

References

1988 births
Living people
French male hurdlers
World Athletics Championships athletes for France
People from Montfermeil
Sportspeople from Seine-Saint-Denis
21st-century French people